The mixed 4 × 400 metres relay event at the 2020 Summer Olympics took place on 30 and 31 July 2021 at the Japan National Stadium. There were 16 competing relay teams, with each team having 4 members (2 men and 2 women). It was the first mixed-gender relay in athletics held at the Olympic Games, as part of a larger focus on gender equality by the International Olympic Committee.

Summary
After finishing first and second in their heat, USA and Dominican Republic teams were initially disqualified for an alleged baton changeover violation. Both teams appealed and the decision was reversed. This meant that German and Spanish teams, that qualified after the disqualifications, did not qualify to the final—they protested, and it was decided that Germany could start the final as ninth team. The Dutch and Belgian teams protested against the reinstatements—both protests were rejected by the CAS.

In the final, the Netherlands' Liemarvin Bonevacia took the lead going in to the first handoff, with Karol Zalewski (Poland), Trevor Stewart (USA) and Dylan Borlée (Belgium) in contention. Through the third turn, Marileidy Paulino pulled Dominican Republic past all the teams, squeezing past the Netherlands' Lieke Klaver after the break to take the lead. Kendall Ellis powered through the fourth turn passing Poland's Natalia Kaczmarek and Klaver chasing after Paulino. Down the home stretch, Ellis tied up and Kaczmarek ran past. Anabel Medina left the pass with almost a 3-second Dominican lead. Netherlands went with their star 400 hurdler Femke Bol, along with Justyna Święty-Ersetic for Poland and Kaylin Whitney for USA separating as a 3-person pack in chase of Medina. Bol almost made it, pulling the pack to just behind Medina at the handoff, the teams leaving the zone with Alexander Ogando (DOM), Ramsey Angela (NED), Kajetan Duszyński (POL) and Vernon Norwood (USA) in a row. Halfway through the lap, Angela passed Ogando, then Duszyński gained through the final turn with Norwood in tow. Coming off the turn, Duszyński went past Angela into the lead. With 30 metres to go, the three chasers were in a row across the track, but Norwood had the momentum to move into second place. Duszyński had too much of a lead, crossing the finish line with his arms outstretched. Unable to catch Duszyński, Norwood relaxed and glided across the line, but Ogando continued to chase and got silver for the Dominican Republic.

Background
This was the first appearance of the event, added along with mixed team events in multiple sports for the 2020 Games. The mixed relay was first introduced at the 2017 IAAF World Relays. It was added to the World Championship programme at the 2019 World Athletics Championships.

Qualification

A National Olympic Committee (NOC) could qualify a relay team of 4 athletes in one of three ways. A total of 16 NOCs qualified.

 The top 8 NOCs at the 2019 World Athletics Championships qualified a relay team.
 The top 8 NOCs at the 2021 World Athletics Relays qualified a relay team.
 Where an NOC placed in the top 8 at both the 2019 World Championships and the 2021 World Relays, the quota place was allocated to the world ranking list as of 29 June 2021. In this case, 3 teams did so, so there are 3 places available through the world rankings.

The qualifying period was originally from 1 May 2019 to 29 June 2020. Due to the COVID-19 pandemic, the period was suspended from 6 April 2020 to 30 November 2020, with the end date extended to 29 June 2021. The qualifying time standards could be obtained in various meets during the given period that have the approval of the IAAF. Both indoor and outdoor meets are eligible. The most recent Area Championships may be counted in the ranking, even if not during the qualifying period.

Competition format
The event used the two-round format introduced for other relay events in 2012.

Each team consists of two men and two women. The team members can run in any order.

Records

Prior to this competition, the existing world, Olympic, and area records are as follows.

Schedule

All times are Japan Standard Time (UTC+9)

The mixed 4 × 400 metres relay took place over two consecutive days.

Results

Heats
Qualification Rules: First 3 in each heat (Q) and the next 2 fastest (q) advance to the Final

Heat 1

Heat 2

Final

References

Mixed 4 x 400 metres relay
Olympics 2020
Mixed events at the 2020 Summer Olympics